The Maslenica Bridge (also known as ) is a deck arch bridge carrying the D8 state road spanning the Novsko Ždrilo strait of the Adriatic Sea approximately  to the west of the settlement of Maslenica, Croatia and  south of the D54 and D8 state roads junction. It was built in 2005 on a site of a similar bridge that was destroyed in 1991, during the Croatian War of Independence.

Structure 

The deck structure comprises a grillage consisting of the deck slab with longitudinal girders and cross-girders. The bridge piers and spandrel columns comprise hollow square cross-section. The arch comprises a box cross section and provides a  clearance below the bridge.

The first Maslenica Bridge 
The original Maslenica Bridge was designed by Vojislav Draganić of Inženjerski Projektni Zavod (IPZ) between 1955 and 1960. By 1989, wear caused by heavy traffic and inadequate maintenance became significant, including cracks on the cross-girders and a pier. That led to a half-year-long suspension of freight traffic across the bridge while it was repaired.  The issues with the spandrel structure and the piers were remediated at that time by strengthening the pier and column cross-sections and by repairs to the cross-girder joints. During the summer of 1990, the bridge was once again in full operation, followed by another period of restricted use while the rehabilitation works were completed.

The bridge was destroyed by explosives on 21 November 1991 during the Croatian War of Independence. Prior to its demolition it represented the last road link between Zagreb and Split left intact within the territory controlled by the government of the Republic of Croatia thereby being of immense importance.

Pontoon bridge 
In July 1993, as control of the bridge general area was restored to the Republic of Croatia, a pontoon bridge was completed near the location of destroyed Maslenica Bridge in order to restore the road route linking the Croatian capital and Dalmatia.

The bridge was executed atop barges and served as the only road link between Zagreb and Split (that did not require use of ferries or occupied territories) between 1993 and 1995. The pontoon bridge was repeatedly attacked by artillery causing occasional damage or even sinking of individual barges which were subsequently replaced. After 1995 and conclusion of the Croatian War of Independence the pontoon bridge lost some of its importance as overland routes became available.

Reconstruction of the Maslenica Bridge 
In 2003 Hrvatske ceste started tender procedure regarding reconstruction of the Maslenica Bridge in its original form. The remains of the original bridge left over were pier foundations (some of them shifted or damaged) and the southern abutment. The reconstruction design was based on the original construction designs which were still available. All basic structural elements were left unchanged, while some changes were necessary due to changes to construction code implemented since completion of the original bridge. Most significant portion of those applied to earthquake safety. Furthermore, roadway grade has changed somewhat and new types of safety railings are placed along the sidewalks. The reconstruction of the Maslenica Bridge was completed and the bridge opened on 17 June 2005.

The construction (or rather reconstruction) costs were 59.8 million Croatian kuna, while removal of the remains of the original bridge required additional 2.2 million kuna. At the opening ceremony it was declared that the reconstructed Maslenica Bridge would also serve as an alternative route to be used during periods of strong wind at the nearby motorway bridge.

The reconstruction works consumed 1,556 tons of concrete, 210 tons of reinforcing steel, and 209 cubic meters of stone cladding.

This bridge offers the highest bungee jumping in Croatia (56 meters).

Naming confusion 
Therefore, both bridges are confusingly called both "old" and "new" Maslenica Bridge.

Traffic volume 
Traffic on the state roads in Croatia is regularly counted and reported by Hrvatske ceste, operator of the state roads. There is no actual traffic count performed at the Maslenica Bridge itself, however Hrvatske ceste operate a counting station which covers a section of the D8 state road adjacent to the D8 and D54 junction (to the north of the junction).

See also 
 Maslenica Bridge (A1)
 D8 state road

References 

Bridges completed in 1961
Bridges completed in 2005
Deck arch bridges
Buildings and structures in Zadar County
Rebuilt buildings and structures in Croatia
Cross-sea bridges in Croatia
Transport in Zadar County